Barbara Paulus was the defending champion but lost in the final 3–6, 6–2, 6–1 against Henrieta Nagyová.

Seeds
A champion seed is indicated in bold text while text in italics indicates the round in which that seed was eliminated.

 n/a
  Barbara Paulus (final)
  Karina Habšudová (semifinals)
 n/a
  Silvia Farina (semifinals)
  Katarína Studeníková (quarterfinals)
  Karin Kschwendt (second round)
  Sabine Hack (first round)
  Alexandra Fusai (first round)

Draw

External links
 1996 Warsaw Cup by Heros Draw

Warsaw Open
1996 WTA Tour